Hasanabad-e Sadat (also Romanized as Ḩasanābād-e Sādāt; also known as Ḩasanābād) is a village in Dodangeh-ye Sofla Rural District, Ziaabad District, Takestan County, Qazvin Province, Iran. At the 2006 census, its population was 272, in 76 families.

References 

Populated places in Takestan County